Stephens is a surname. It is a patronymic and is recorded in England from 1086.

Notable people with the surname include:
Alexander H. Stephens (1812–1883), Vice President of the Confederate States
Alison Stephens (1970–2010), British mandolinist
Ann S. Stephens (1813–1886), U.S. dime novelist
Anne Stephens (WRAF officer) (1912–2000), director of the Women's Royal Air Force
Annie Fitzgerald Stephens (1844–1934), American landowner and grandmother of Margaret Mitchell
Arran Stephens (born 1944), Canadian author & organic food advocate
Brandon Stephens (disambiguation), multiple people
Bret Stephens (born 1973), Pulitzer Prize-winning American journalist, editor, and columnist
Charles Stephens (disambiguation), multiple people
Clara Bloodgood, born Clara Stephens (1870–1907)  U.S. stage actress (granddaughter of Ann S. Stephens)
Florence Stephens (1881–1979), landholder and the main figure of the Huseby court case
Frederic George Stephens (1828–1907), British art critic and member of the Pre-Raphaelite Brotherhood
George Stephens (disambiguation), several people
H. F. Stephens (1868–1931), British civil engineer in railroads
Harry J. Stephens (1866–1947) newspaperman in agricultural Australia
Helen Stephens (1918–1994), U.S. athlete
Henry Stephens (disambiguation), several people
Hubert D. Stephens (1875–1946), Mississippi politician
Jackson Stephens (baseball) (born 1994), American baseball player
James Stephens (disambiguation), several people
James Francis Stephens (1792–1852), English zoologist
Jane Stephens (1879–1959), Irish zoologist
Jane Stephens (actress) (1812?–1896), British actress
John Lloyd Stephens (1805–1852), U.S. explorer and diplomat
John Roger Stephens (born 1978), American singer-songwriter and pianist, known as John Legend
Kenny Stephens (born 1946), English footballer
Linden Stephens (born 1995), American football player
Marvin Stephens (born 1923), American actor
Maybelle Stephens (1872–1919), American suffragist
Meic Stephens (1938–2018), Welsh literary editor and journalist
Mitchell Stephens (disambiguation), several people
Nathan Stephens (born 1988), Welsh athlete
Oswold Stephens (1896–1980), New Zealander teacher, chemist, and potter
Philip Stephens (journalist), an associate editor of the Financial Times
Sir Philip Stephens, 1st Baronet (1723–1809), British First Secretary of the Admiralty during the American Revolution
Rayner Stephens (1805–1879), Scottish Methodist minister
Richard Stephens (disambiguation), several people
Richie Stephens (Richard Stephenson, born 1966), Jamaican singer and producer
Robert Stephens (1931–1995), British actor
Rockwell Stephens (1900–1982), U.S. author and recreational skiing pioneer
Rycklon Stephens (born 1978), American professional wrestler better known as Ezekiel Jackson
Samuel Stephens (disambiguation), several people
Santo Stephens (born 1969), American football player
Sarah Stephens (born 1990), Australian model and actress
Simon Stephens (born 1971), British playwright
Sloane Stephens (born 1993), American tennis player
Stan Stephens (1929–2021), U.S. politician
Steve Stephens, U.S. television host and musician
Suzanne Stephens (born 1946), American clarinetist and basset horn player, resident in Germany
Thomas Stephens (historian) (1821–1875), Welsh historian and critic
Toby Stephens (born 1969), British actor
Uriah Smith Stephens (1821–1882), U.S. labor leader
Ursula Stephens (born 1954), Australian Senator
Vern Stephens (1920–1968), U.S. baseball player
Warren Stephens (born 1957), American businessman of Stephens Inc.
William Stephens (disambiguation), several people
Willis Stephens (born 1955), U.S. politician
Woody Stephens (1913–1998), U.S. thoroughbred horse racing trainer

References

See also
St. Stephens (disambiguation) 
Stephens Inc.

Surnames from given names
Surnames of British Isles origin
English-language surnames
Patronymic surnames
es:Stephens
pt:Stephens